The Homestead Acts were several laws in the United States by which an applicant could acquire ownership of government land or the public domain, typically called a homestead.

An extension of the homestead principle in law, the Homestead Acts were an expression of the Free Soil policy of Northerners who wanted individual farmers to own and operate their own farms, as opposed to Southern slave owners who wanted to buy up large tracts of land and use slave labor, thereby shutting out free white farmers.

The first of the acts, the Homestead Act of 1862, opened up millions of acres. Any adult who had never taken up arms against the federal government of the United States could apply. Women and immigrants who had applied for citizenship were eligible.

Several additional laws were enacted in the late 19th and early 20th centuries. The Southern Homestead Act of 1866 sought to address land ownership inequalities in the south during Reconstruction. It explicitly included Black Americans and encouraged them to participate, but rampant discrimination, systemic barriers, and bureaucratic inertia slowed Black gains. Despite those hurdles, the 1866 law was not as beneficial as it might have been, but it was part of the reason that by 1900, one quarter of all Southern Black farmers owned their own farms.

The Timber Culture Act of 1873 granted land to a claimant who was required to plant trees—the tract could be added to an existing homestead claim and had no residency requirement. The Kinkaid Amendment of 1904 granted a full section——to new homesteaders settling in western Nebraska. Another amended act, the national Stock-Raising Homestead Act, was passed in 1916 and granted  for ranching purposes.

Background 
Land-grant laws similar to the Homestead Acts had been proposed by northern Republicans prior to Civil War but they had been repeatedly blocked in Congress by Democrats who wanted western lands open for purchase by slave owners. The Homestead Act of 1860 passed in Congress but was vetoed by President James Buchanan, a Democrat. After the Southern states seceded from the Union in 1861 (and their representatives had left Congress), the bill passed and was signed into law by President Abraham Lincoln (May 20, 1862). Daniel Freeman became the first person to file a claim under the new act.

Between 1862 and 1934, the federal government granted 1.6 million homesteads and distributed  of federal land for private ownership. This was a total of 10% of all land in the United States. Homesteading was discontinued in 1976, except in Alaska, where it continued until 1986. About 40% of the applicants who started the process were able to complete it and obtain title to their homesteaded land after paying a small fee in cash.

Homestead laws depleted Native American resources as much of the land they relied on was taken by the federal government and sold to settlers.

History

Preemption Act of 1841 

The Preemption Act of 1841 allowed settlers to claim up to 160 acres of federal land for themselves, and prevent its sale to others including large landowners or corporations; they paid only a low fixed price of $1.25 per acre ($3.09 per hectare).  To qualify, a person had to be either 21 years old or a "head of household" (such as a parent or surviving sibling supporting a family), a citizen or an immigrant declaring to become a citizen, and a resident on that land for a minimum of 14 months.  To get permanent title to the land, the person had to accomplish specific things, such as continue to reside on it or improve it for at least five years; they could not leave or abandon it for more than six months at a time.

Donation Land Claim Act of 1850 

The Donation Land Claim Act allowed settlers to claim land in the Oregon Territory, then including the modern states of Washington, Oregon, Idaho and parts of Wyoming. The Oregon Donation Land Claim Act was passed in 1850 and allowed white settlers to claim 320 acres or 640 to married couples between 1850 and 1855 when the act was repealed. Before it was repealed in 1855, the land was sold for $1.25 per acre. After the creation of the Oregon territory in 1848, the US government had passed the most generous land distribution bill in US history.

The Oregon Land Donation Act of 1850 had many negative effects on Indigenous people as well as Black people in the Pacific Northwest. Not only did the act use the land taken away from the Indigenous people in the Pacific Northwest, but the act also barred Black citizens from owning land and real estate. The act guaranteed land for white settlers and "half-breed" Indian men to the Oregon territory. This act followed the passing of the 1848 territorial organic act which allowed any white settler to claim a maximum of six hundred and forty acres. The Land Donation Act, however, also acknowledged women's property rights due to Congress allowing the donation of four hundred acres to settlers—land that could be claimed by heads of households—including women. This act differed from the Homestead Act of 1866 due to the ineligibility of Black citizens from applying.

Homestead Act of 1862 

The "yeoman farmer" ideal of Jeffersonian democracy was still a powerful influence in American politics during the 1840–1850s, with many politicians believing a homestead act would help increase the number of "virtuous yeomen". The Free Soil Party of 1848–52, and the new Republican Party after 1854, demanded that the new lands opening up in the west be made available to independent farmers, rather than wealthy planters who would develop it with the use of slaves forcing the yeomen farmers onto marginal lands. Southern Democrats had continually fought (and defeated) previous homestead law proposals, as they feared free land would attract European immigrants and poor Southern whites to the west.

The intent of the Homestead Act of 1862 was to reduce the cost of homesteading under the Preemption Act; after the South seceded and their delegates left Congress in 1861, the Republicans and supporters from the upper South passed a homestead act signed by Abraham Lincoln on May 20, 1862, which went into effect on Jan. 1st, 1863.  Its leading advocates were Andrew Johnson George Henry Evans and Horace Greeley.  George Henry Evans famously coined the phrase "Vote Yourself a Farm" in a bid to garner support for the movement.

In addition to the previous requirement in the Preemption Act of being either 21 years old or the head of a family, the 1862 act also allowed for persons under 21 who had served in the regular or volunteer forces of the U.S. army or navy for at least 14 days during "the existence of an actual war domestic or foreign".

The new act also required that the person "has never borne arms against the United States Government or given aid and comfort to its enemies"; unlike the 1848 and 1850 laws, it did not have any provision mentioning race. The act insured adult U.S citizens 160 acres of land from the government to "improve their plot by cultivating the land".

The Homestead act expanded, rather than changed, the 1841 Preemption Act.  The claimed homestead could include the same land which they had previously filed a preemption claim (on up to 160 acres at $1.25 per acre, or up to 80 acres of subdivided and surveyed land at $2.50 per acre), and they could expand their current ownership to contiguous adjacent land up to 160 acres total.

However, the homestead application must be "made for his or her exclusive use and benefit, and that said entry [onto public land] is made for the purpose of actual settlement and cultivation, and not either directly or indirectly for the use or benefit of any other person or persons whomsoever".  The acquired land would not be liable for any debts incurred prior to the issuance of the patent for it.

The time requirement for residence or cultivation was set at 5 years; if it was proven "after due notice" that they moved residence or abandoned the land for more than six months at a time, then the land reverted to the government.  A  homesteader could also pay the $1.25 (or the current rate) per acre price after proof of the less-stringent requirements set in the Preemption Act.

After filing an affidavit with the government's agent, and paying him a $10 fee, the homesteader could begin occupying their claim.  The government agent received the same fee for homestead land as he would have received if that land was sold for cash, 1/2 from the homesteader's filing fee and the other half from the patent (certificate) fee.  The homesteader did not get a certificate or patent until they or their heirs filed, after 5 years (but before 7 years), further affidavits from two neighbors or "credible witnesses" and an additional $8 fee.  Those affidavits affirmed the 5 years of residence or cultivation and that "no part of said land has been alienated [transferred or mortgaged], and that he [the homesteader] has borne true allegiance to the Government of the United States".

If both parents died and all the children were under 21, an executor under state law could sell (for the benefit of the children, and not the estate) an absolute title to the land within two years of the parent's death. The purchaser would pay office fees for a patent to the land.

Southern Homestead Act of 1866 

Enacted to allow poor tenant farmers and sharecroppers in the South to become landowners in the Southern United States during Reconstruction. It was not very successful, as even the low prices and fees were often too much for the applicants to afford.

Timber Culture Act of 1873 

The Timber Culture Act granted up to 160 acres of land to a homesteader who would plant at least 40 acres (revised to 10) of trees over a period of several years. This quarter-section could be added to an existing homestead claim, offering a total of 320 acres to a settler.

Kinkaid Amendment of 1904 

Recognizing that the Sandhills of north-central Nebraska required more than 160 acres for a claimant to support a family, Congress passed the Kinkaid Act, which granted larger homestead tracts, up to 640 acres, to homesteaders in Nebraska.

Forest Homestead Act of 1906 
This act allowed homesteads within Forest Reserves (created from 1891 on) and National Forests (from 1905? on), responding to opponents of the nation's Forest Reserves who felt land suited for agriculture was being withheld from private development. Homestead applications were reviewed by the U.S. Forest Service (created in 1905). While at first five years residency was required (per the 1862 Act), in 1913 this act was amended to allow proving up in just three years.

Enlarged Homestead Act of 1909 
Because by the early 1900s much of the prime low-lying alluvial land along rivers had been homesteaded, the Enlarged Homestead Act was passed in 1909. To enable dryland farming, it increased the number of acres for a homestead to  given to farmers who accepted more marginal lands (especially in the Great Plains), which could not be easily irrigated.

A massive influx of these new farmers, combined with inappropriate cultivation techniques and misunderstanding of the ecology, led to immense land erosion and eventually the Dust Bowl of the 1930s.

Stock-Raising Homestead Act of 1916 

In 1916, the Stock-Raising Homestead Act was passed for settlers seeking  of public land for ranching purposes.

Subsistence Homesteads provisions under the New Deal – 1930s 

Renewed interest in homesteading was brought about by U.S. President Franklin D. Roosevelt's program of Subsistence Homesteading implemented in the 1930s under the New Deal.

Small Tracts Act 
In 1938 Congress passed a law, called the Small Tract Act (STA) of 1938, by which it is possible for any citizen to obtain certain lands from the Federal Government for residence, recreation, or business purposes. These tracts may not usually be larger than 5 acres. A 5-acre tract would be one which is 660 feet long and 330 feet wide, or its equivalent. The property was to be improved with a building. Starting July 1955, improvement was required to be minimum of 400 sq. feet of space. 4,000 previously classified Small Tracts were offered at public auction at fair market value, circa 1958, by the Los Angeles Office of BLM.

In practice 
Settlers found land and filed their claims at the regional land office, usually in individual family units, although others formed closer-knit communities. Often, the homestead consisted of several buildings or structures besides the main house.

The Homestead Act of 1862 gave rise later to a new phenomenon, large land rushes, such as the Oklahoma Land Runs of the 1880s and '90s.

End of homesteading 

The Federal Land Policy and Management Act of 1976 ended homesteading; by that time, federal government policy had shifted to retaining control of western public lands. The only exception to this new policy was in Alaska, for which the law allowed homesteading until 1986.

He fulfilled all requirements of the homestead act in 1979 but did not receive his deed until May 1988. He is the last person to receive a title to land claimed under the Homestead Acts.

Issues and concerns 
The Homestead Acts were sometimes abused, but historians continue to debate the extent. In the 1950s and 1960s, historians Fred Shannon, Roy Robbins, and Paul Wallace Gates emphasized fraudulent episodes, and historians largely turned away from the issue. In recent decades, however, the argument has mostly been that on the whole fraud was a relatively minor element and that strongly positive impacts regarding women and the family have only recently been appreciated. Robert Higgs argues that the Homestead Act induced no long-term misallocation of resources. In 1995, a random survey of 178 members of the Economic History Association found that 70 percent of economists and 84 percent of economic historians disagreed that "Nineteenth-century U.S. land policy, which attempted to give away free land, probably represented a net drain on the productive capacity of the country."

Although the intent was to grant land for agriculture, in the arid areas just east of the Rocky Mountains,  was generally too little land for a viable farm (at least prior to major federal public investments in irrigation projects). In these areas, people manipulated the provisions of the act to gain control of resources, especially water. A common scheme was for an individual, acting as a front for a large cattle operation, to file for a homestead surrounding a water source, under the pretense that the land was to be used as a farm. Once the land was granted, other cattle ranchers would be denied the use of that water source, effectively closing off the adjacent public land to competition. That method was also used by large businesses and speculators to gain ownership of timber and oil-producing land. The federal government charged royalties for extraction of these resources from public lands. On the other hand, homesteading schemes were generally pointless for land containing "locatable minerals", such as gold and silver, which could be controlled through mining claims under the Mining Act of 1872, for which the federal government did not charge royalties.

The government developed no systematic method to evaluate claims under the Homestead Acts. Land offices relied on affidavits from witnesses that the claimant had lived on the land for the required period of time and made the required improvements. In practice, some of these witnesses were bribed or otherwise colluded with the claimant.

It was common practice and not fraudulent for the eligible children of a large family to claim nearby land as soon as possible. After a few generations, a family could build up a sizable estate.

The homesteads were criticized as too small for the environmental conditions on the Great Plains; a homesteader using 19th-century animal-powered tilling and harvesting could not have cultivated the 1,500 acres later recommended for dry land farming. Some scholars believe the acreage limits were reasonable when the act was written, but argue that no one understood the physical conditions of the plains.

According to Hugh Nibley, much of the rainforest west of Portland, Oregon, was acquired by the Oregon Lumber Company by illegal claims under the Act.

Related acts in other countries

Canada 
Similar laws were passed in Canada:

The Legislative Assembly of Ontario passed The Free Grants and Homestead Act in 1868, which introduced a conditional scheme to an existing free grant plan previously authorized by the Province of Canada in The Public Lands Act of 1860. It was extended to include settlement in the Rainy River District under The Rainy River Free Grants and Homestead Act, 1886, These Acts were consolidated in 1913 in The Public Lands Act, which was further extended in 1948 to provide for free grants to former members of the Canadian Forces. The original free grant provisions for settlers were repealed in 1951, and the remaining provisions were repealed in 1961.

The Parliament of Canada passed the Dominion Lands Act in 1872 in order to encourage settlement in the Northwest Territories. Its application was restricted after the passage of the Natural Resources Acts in 1930, and it was finally repealed in 1950.

The Legislative Assembly of Quebec did not expand the scope of the 1860 Province of Canada Act (which modern day Quebec was part of in 1860), but did provide in 1868 that such lands were exempt from seizure, and chattels thereon were also exempt for the first ten years of occupation. Later known as the Settlers Protection Act, it was repealed in 1984.

Newfoundland and Labrador provided for free grants of land upon proof of possession for twenty years prior to 1977, with continuous use for agricultural, business or residential purposes during that time. Similar programs continued to operate in Alberta and British Columbia until 1970. In the early 21st century, some land is still being granted in the Yukon Territory under its Agricultural Lands Program.

New Zealand 
Despite the 1840 Treaty of Waitangi provisions for sale of land, the Māori Land Court decided that all land not cultivated by Māori was 'waste land' and belonged to the Crown without purchase. Most provinces in colonial New Zealand had Waste Lands Acts enacted between 1854 and 1877. The 1874 Waste Lands Act in Auckland Province used the term Homestead, with allocation administered by a Crown Lands Board. There was similar legislation in Westland. They had to live there for five years, build a house and cultivate a third of the land, if already open, or a fifth if bush had to be cleared. The land was forfeited if they didn't clear enough bush. Further amendments were made in 1877, 1882 and 1885, adding details such as pastoral and perpetual leases and village and special settlements. This contributed to rapid deforestation.

Australia 
Several selection acts were passed in colonial Australia which were based on the Crown Lands Acts. They were passed in all six of the Australian colonies prior to federation, with the first one, New South Wales, passing such legislation in 1861.

In popular culture 

 Laura Ingalls Wilder's Little House on the Prairie series describes her father and family claiming a homestead in Kansas, and later Dakota Territory. Wilder's daughter Rose Wilder Lane published a novel, Free Land, which describes the trials of homesteaders in what is now South Dakota.
 Willa Cather's novels O Pioneers! and My Ántonia feature families homesteading on the Great Plains.
 Oscar Micheaux's novel The Homesteader: a Novel (1917) is a semi-autobiographical story of an African American homesteader in South Dakota shortly after the turn of the 20th century.
 The Rodgers and Hammerstein musical Oklahoma! is based in the Oklahoma land rush.
 The 1962 Elvis Presley musical film Follow That Dream, adapted from Pioneer, Go Home! (1959), features a family that homesteads in Florida.
 The movie Far and Away, starring Tom Cruise and Nicole Kidman, centers on the main characters' struggle to "obtain their 160 acres."
 The miniseries Centennial depicts the homestead development of an eastern Colorado town.
 The 1953 movie Shane depicts some early homesteaders in Wyoming opposed by a cattle baron who abuses, threatens and terrorizes them, calling them "pig farmers," "sod-busters," "squatters" and other taunts and insults. When the rancher gets violent, the homesteaders are divided over whether to leave or to hold onto their claims. A drifter working on one of the homesteads reluctantly tries to take action.
 The 2016 film The Magnificent Seven, loosely adapted from the 1960 film of the same name, features Sam Chisolm, an African American U.S. Marshal raised on a homestead in Lincoln, Kansas. His family had been lynched in 1867 by former Confederate Army soldiers, hired by a robber baron to drive off settlers and free up real estate on the American frontier.

See also 
 Desert Land Act
 Homestead National Monument of America
 Land Act of 1804
 Forty acres and a mule
 Russian Homestead Act
 South 40

Notes

References

Further reading 

 Combs, H. Jason, Natasha Winfield, and Paul R. Burger. (2019) "Nebraska's Pioneer and Heritage Farms: A Geographical and Historical Perspective." Great Plains Quarterly 39.1 (2019): 59-75.
 Dick, Everett. The Lure of the Land: A Social History of the Public Lands from the Articles of Confederation to the New Deal. (1970).
 Edwards, Richard. (2009) "Changing perceptions of homesteading as a policy of public domain disposal." Great Plains Quarterly 29.3 (2009): 179-202. online
 Edwards, Richard. "Invited Essay: The New Learning about Homesteading." Great Plains Quarterly 38.1 (2018): 1-23. online
 Edwards, Richard. "To Commute or Not Commute, the Homesteader's Dilemma." Great Plains Quarterly 38.2 (2018): 129-150. online
 Edwards, Richard, Jacob K. Friefeld, and Rebecca S. Wingo. Homesteading the Plains: Toward a New History (2019) excerpt
 Gates, Paul Wallace. "The homestead law in an incongruous land system." American Historical Review 41.4 (1936): 652-681. online
 Gates, Paul Wallace. Free homesteads for all Americans: the Homestead act of 1862 (1963) online.
 Hansen, Karen V., Grey Osterud, and Valerie Grim. "'Land Was One of the Greatest Gifts': Women's Landownership in Dakota Indian, Immigrant Scandinavian, and African American Communities." Great Plains Quarterly 38.3 (2018): 251-272. online
 Hyman, Harold M. American Singularity: The 1787 Northwest Ordinance, the 1862 Homestead and Morrill Acts, and the 1944 G.I. Bill. (1986) online
 Lause, Mark A. Young America: Land, Labor, and the Republican Community. (2005)
 Patterson-Black, Sheryll. "Women homesteaders on the Great Plains frontier." Frontiers: A Journal of Women Studies (1976): 67–88. in JSTOR
 Richardson, Heather Cox. The Greatest Nation of the Earth: Republican Economic Policies during the Civil War. (1997).
 Robbins, Roy M. Our Landed Heritage: The Public Domain, 1776–1936. (1942)online
 Shanks, Trina R.W. "The Homestead Act: A major asset-building policy in American history." in  pp: 20–41.
 Smith, Sherry L. "Single women homesteaders: the perplexing case of Elinore Pruitt Stewart." Western Historical Quarterly (1991): 163–183. in JSTOR, with additional citations
 Smith, Henry Nash. Virgin Land: The American West as Symbol and Myth. (1959). online
 Wilm, Julius. "'The Indians must yield': Antebellum Free Land, the Homestead Act, and the Displacement of Native Peoples." Bulletin of the German Historical Institute (Winter 2020): 17-39. online

External links 

 U.S. Bureau of Land Management Homesteading Timeline
 Homestead Act. – Library of Congress
 Text of 1862 Homestead Act
 Homestead National Monument of America. – National Park Service
 Homestead Act of 1862. – National Archives and Records Administration
 Land Acquisition and Dispossession: Mapping the Homestead Act, 1863–1912 – interactive web map.
 "Adeline Hornbek and the Homestead Act: A Colorado Success Story". – National Park Service Teaching with Historic Places (TwHP) lesson plan. – National Park Service
 Homesteaders and Pioneers on the Olympic Peninsula – an exhibit from the University of Washington Library

1862 in American law
Economic history of the United States
American frontier
United States federal public land legislation
1862 in American politics
History of agriculture in the United States
Settlement schemes in the United States